Greggy Liwag is a former Filipino actor. In 1984 he married Rosita Capuyon, Miss Philippines, 1983. They have three children, Nicole, John and Christopher. Since 1989, Liwag and his family reside in the United States.

Life and career
He appeared in movies such as Stepsisters (1979) with Lorna Tolentino, Tambay Sa Disco (1980) with Alma Moreno, High School Scandal (1981) with Gina Alajar, Palengke Queen (1982) with Nora Aunor, and Puppy Love (1982) with Janice de Belen. He did bold films such as Bomba Queen (1985) with Sarsi Emmanuelle, Paano Ang Aking Gabi? (1985) with Lala Montelibano, and Desperada (1986) with Vida Verde, among others.

He was formerly linked to actress Pia Moran.

Filmography

References

External links

Living people
Filipino male film actors
Year of birth missing (living people)
Filipino expatriates in the United States